Laurera is a genus of fungi within the Trypetheliaceae family.

Species
It was known to have nearly 50 species at one point in time, but most have these have become synonyms for other species, within the Astrothelium and Bathelium genera (both still within the Trypetheliaceae family).

Leaving;
 Laurera chrysocarpa 
 Laurera sepulta

References

Trypetheliaceae
Taxa named by Ludwig Reichenbach